Events from the year 1697 in Denmark

Incumbents
 Monarch – Christian V

Events

Births
 7 January – Wilhelm August von der Osten, civil servant (died 1764)
 2 May – Michael Fabritius, businessman (died 1746)

Deaths

26 January – Georg Mohr, mathematician (born 1640)
8 April – Niels Juel, admiral (born 1629 in Norway).

References

 
Denmark
Years of the 17th century in Denmark